The 2029 Rugby World Cup is scheduled to be the eleventh edition of the Rugby World Cup for women. The tournament is to be held in Australia.

References

 

2029 in rugby union
2029
World Cup 2029
World Cup